Baldev Singh (born c.1920) was an Indian athlete. He competed in the men's long jump and the men's decathlon at the 1948 Summer Olympics.

References

External links
 

Year of birth uncertain
Possibly living people
Athletes (track and field) at the 1948 Summer Olympics
Indian male long jumpers
Indian decathletes
Olympic athletes of India
Place of birth missing
Asian Games medalists in athletics (track and field)
Asian Games silver medalists for India
Athletes (track and field) at the 1951 Asian Games
Medalists at the 1951 Asian Games
20th-century Indian people